Nicholas Nash Eberstadt (born 1955) is an American political economist. He holds the Henry Wendt Chair in Political Economy at the American Enterprise Institute (AEI), a political think tank.  He is also a Senior Adviser to the National Bureau of Asian Research (NBR), a member of the visiting committee at the Harvard School of Public Health, and a member of the Global Leadership Council at the World Economic Forum.

Early life and education
Eberstadt was born on December 20, 1955 in New York City. His father, Frederick Eberstadt, was an author and photographer. His mother, Isabel Nash, was a novelist. His paternal grandfather, Ferdinand Eberstadt, was an investment banker and co-founder of the Central Intelligence Agency; his maternal grandfather, Ogden Nash, was a poet. His sister, Fernanda Eberstadt, is a novelist.

Eberstadt graduated from Phillips Exeter Academy in 1972. He then earned his A.B. magna cum laude in economics from Harvard College in 1976, and his M.Sc. in Social Planning for Developing Countries from the London School of Economics in 1978.  He completed his M.P.A. at Harvard Kennedy School in 1979, and his Ph.D. in Political Economy and Government at Harvard University in 1995.

Career
Eberstadt was a teaching fellow at Harvard University from 1976 to 1979, instructing courses in population and natural resources, agricultural economics, social science and social policy, and problems of policy making in less developed countries.  He was a visiting research fellow at the Rockefeller Foundation from 1979 to 1980, meanwhile serving as an associate of Harvard's Belfer Center for Science and International Affairs.  From 1980 to 2002, Eberstadt was a visiting fellow at the Harvard Center for Population and Development Studies. Eberstadt joined his current institution, the American Enterprise Institute, as a visiting fellow in 1985. He assumed the Henry Wendt Chair in Political Economy and became a resident fellow in 1999.

From 1988 to 1990, Eberstadt served as an adviser to the Catholic University Institute on Health and Development.  In 1999 he was a visiting fellow at the University of Washington, Seattle.  Eberstadt was awarded the Bosch Fellowship in Public Policy in 2008, from the American Academy in Berlin.

Eberstadt has written many books and articles on political and economic issues, including demographics and the political situation of North Korea.  He has consulted for governmental and international organizations, the U.S. Census Bureau, U.S. State Department, USAID, and World Bank, and has often been invited to offer expert testimony before Congress.

Eberstadt served on the President's Commission on Bioethics (2006–2009) and the Presidential HELP Commission (2005–2008). From 2003 to present, he has been a member of The Public Interest's Publication Committee, the Overseers‘ Committee to Visit the Harvard School of Public Health, the National Center for Health Statistics Board of Scientific Counselors, and the U.S.–China AIDS Foundation's Advisory Board.  He is a founding member of the U.S. Committee for Human Rights in North Korea, and the Commissioner of the Center for Strategic and International Studies (CSIS) Global Aging Initiative.

He was awarded the AEI Irving Kristol Award in 2020.

Personal life
Eberstadt married Mary Tedeschi, now a scholar at the Hoover Institution, in 1987. They have four children: Rick, Kate, Izzi, and Alexandra and reside in Washington, D.C.. His daughters, Izzi and Kate, graduates of Barnard College and Columbia University, respectively, founded the music duo Delune.

Selected works

Eberstadt, Nicholas (2017). Our Miserable 21st Century. Commentary. 15 February 2017.
Eberstadt, Nicholas (2021). Can America Cope with Demographic Decline?. Commentary. 18 October 2021.

See also

Phillip Longman
Eric Kaufmann

References

External links
 

Living people
1955 births
People from New York City
Harvard College alumni
Alumni of the London School of Economics
Harvard Kennedy School alumni
Economists from New York (state)
Experts on North Korea
National Bureau of Asian Research
21st-century American economists
Phillips Exeter Academy alumni
People from Washington, D.C.